Lactobacillus porci is a species of bacteria that falls within the Lactobacillus genus. Species within this genus are typically facultative anaerobes, gram-positive rods, non-spore forming, and are able to produce lactic acid from fermentation of glucose. The species of bacteria is located primarily in guts of mammals and insects.

Lactobacillus porci was first discovered in Korea from a pig's small intestine. Scientists used phenotypic and phylogenetic analysis in order to determine the identity of the strain, SG816. The segment of the intestine was suspended into a sodium chloride dilution and then cultured onto de Man, Rogosa, and Sharpe (MSR) agar. The plate was incubated and grown under anaerobic conditions. One convex, ivory colony was formed and then used for DNA extraction to amplify the sequences using 16s rRNA. The product was then compared to other species DNA with phylogenetic trees.

The phylogenetic trees indicated that L. porci is closely related to several Lactobacillus strains. The most closely related strains are  Lactobacillus delbrueckii subsp. bulgaricus, Lactobacillus delbrueckii subsp. indicus, and Lactobacillus delbrueckii. Scientists were also able to determine that L. porci had its own lineage, indicating that it is a novel species.

Overall, L. porci is gram-positive rods, non-motile, catalase negative, non-spore forming, anaerobic, and d-lactic acid producing species.

References 

Lactobacillaceae